Estancia Presidencial Anchorena Airport  is an airport serving Anchorena National Park and the Presidential Estate at Barra de San Juan in Colonia Department, Uruguay. The airport lies along the Río San Juan,  from its confluence into the Río de la Plata estuary.

Airspace over the Presidential Estate is restricted.

See also

 List of airports in Uruguay
 Transport in Uruguay

References

External links
 OpenStreetMap - Estancia Presidencial Anchorena Airport
 HERE Maps - Anchorena
 Anchorena Park 

Airports in Uruguay